John Adriaan 'Ian' Groenewald (born ) is a South African rugby union player for  in the Currie Cup and the Rugby Challenge. His regular position is lock.

References

South African rugby union players
Living people
1992 births
Middelburg
Rugby union locks
Griquas (rugby union) players
Western Province (rugby union) players
Bulls (rugby union) players
Cheetahs (rugby union) players
Free State Cheetahs players
Rugby union players from the Eastern Cape